The 2014 Australian Mixed Doubles Curling Championships were held from October 2 to 5, 2014 at the Maniototo's Curling Ice rink in Naseby, New Zealand. The winners of this championship represented Australia at the 2015 World Mixed Doubles Curling Championship.

Teams
The teams are listed as follows:

Round Robin standings

Tiebreaker
A tie-breaker was played to determine the 4th and 5th placed teams resulting in Team Millikin placing 4th.

Playoffs

Final standings

References

Australian Mixed Doubles Championships
Australian Mixed Doubles Curling Championships
Australian Mixed Doubles Curling Championships
Australian Mixed Doubles Curling